Antonio Menardi (born 5 March 1959 in Cortina d'Ampezzo) is an Italian curler and curling coach.

He participated in the 2006 Winter Olympics, where the Italian men's team finished in seventh place.

Teams

Men's

Mixed

Mixed doubles

Record as a coach of national teams

References

External links

Living people
1959 births
People from Cortina d'Ampezzo
Italian male curlers
Olympic curlers of Italy
Curlers at the 2006 Winter Olympics
Italian curling champions
Italian curling coaches
Sportspeople from the Province of Belluno